George "Kid" Stutz (February 13, 1893 – December 29, 1930) was a  Major League Baseball shortstop. Stutz played for the Philadelphia Phillies in the  season. In 6 career games, he had no hits in 9 at-bats. He batted and threw right-handed.

Stutz was born and died in Philadelphia, Pennsylvania.

External links

1893 births
1930 deaths
Philadelphia Phillies players
Portland Beavers players
Martinsburg Blue Sox players
Baseball players from Pennsylvania